Lucio Calonga (13 December 1939 – 28 February 2007) was a Paraguayan footballer. He played in seven matches for the Paraguay national football team from 1962 to 1963. He was also part of Paraguay's squad for the 1963 South American Championship.

References

External links
 

1939 births
2007 deaths
Paraguayan footballers
Paraguay international footballers
Association football midfielders
Sportspeople from Asunción